East Twin Swallet also known as Upper Twin Swallet  is a karst cave in Burrington Combe on the Mendip Hills in Somerset, England.

The cave is not very stable. The floor is strewn with boulders under which the stream normally flows. The wall sandroof, especially in the upstream portion of the Second Chamber, consist of boulders cemented together with red mud. In the stream passage the mud contains many fossils, mainly crinoids and brachiopods, dissolved out of their limestone matrix. This is a common phenomenon in the caves of the area.

See also 
Caves of the Mendip Hills

References 

Caves of the Mendip Hills
Limestone caves